William Kingswell was MP for Petersfield from  1601 to 1614.

References

People from Petersfield
17th-century English people
English MPs 1597–1598
English MPs 1601
English MPs 1604–1611